The violet-eared waxbill or common grenadier (Granatina granatina) is a common species of estrildid finch found in drier land of Southern Africa.

Taxonomy
The violet-eared waxbill was formally described in 1766 by the Swedish naturalist Carl Linnaeus in the twelfth edition of his Systema Naturae under the binomial name Fringilla granatina. Linnaeus took the specific epithet from the earlier description by the French zoologist Mathurin Jacques Brisson who in 1760 had used the French name Le Grenadin and the Latin Granatinus, meaning "genadier" in English.  Linnaeus mistakenly specified the locality as Brazil. This was an error originally introduced by the English naturalist George Edwards in 1743 who had believed that his specimen had come from Brazil. The locality was amended to Angola by William Lutley Sclater in 1930 and restricted to Huíla Province in Angola by Phillip Clancey in 1959. The violet-eared waxbill is now placed in the genus Granatina  that was introduced in 1890 by the English ornithologist Richard Bowdler Sharpe. The species is treated as monotypic: no subspecies are recognised.

Habitat

It is found in subtropical/ tropical (lowland) dry shrubland and savanna habitats in Angola, Botswana, Mozambique, Namibia, South Africa, Zambia and Zimbabwe. The status of the species is evaluated as Least Concern.

References

BirdLife Species Factsheet

External links
 Violet-eared waxbill - Species text in The Atlas of Southern African Birds.

violet-eared waxbill
Birds of Southern Africa
violet-eared waxbill
violet-eared waxbill